Adolf Philipp Wilhelm Bastian (26 June 18262 February 1905) was a 19th-century polymath best remembered for his contributions to the development of ethnography and the development of anthropology as a discipline. Modern psychology owes him a great debt, because of his theory of the Elementargedanke, which led to Carl Jung's development of the theory of archetypes. His ideas had a formative influence on the "father of American anthropology" Franz Boas, and he also influenced the thought of comparative mythologist Joseph Campbell.

Life
Bastian was born in Bremen, at the time a state of the German Confederation, into a prosperous bourgeois German family of merchants.
His career at university was broad almost to the point of being eccentric. He studied law at the Ruprecht Karl University of Heidelberg, and biology at what is today Humboldt University of Berlin, the Friedrich Schiller University of Jena, and the University of Würzburg. It was at this last university that he attended lectures by Rudolf Virchow and developed an interest in what was then known as 'ethnology'. He finally settled on medicine and earned a degree from Prague in 1850.

Bastian became a ship's doctor and began an eight-year voyage that took him around the world. This was the first of what would be a quarter of a century of travels. He returned to Germany in 1859 and wrote a popular account of his travels along with an ambitious three-volume work entitled Man in History, which became one of his most well-known works.

In 1861 he undertook a four-year trip to Southeast Asia and his account of this trip, The People of East Asia ran to six volumes. when Bastian finally published the studies and observations during his Journey through Cambodia to Cochinchina in Germany in 1868 - told in detail but uninspiredly, above all without a single one of his drawings - this work hardly made an impression, while everyone was talking about Henri Mouhot's posthumous work with vivid descriptions of Angkor, Travels in the Central Parts of Indo-China, Siam, Cambodia and Laos, published in 1864 through the Royal Geographical Society.

He moved to Berlin in 1866, where he became a member of the Academy of Sciences Leopoldina in 1869. Together with Robert Hartmann (1832–1893), Bastian founded the ethnological and anthropological journal, Zeitschrift für Ethnologie (ZfE) in 1869. He also worked with Rudolf Virchow to organize the Berlin Society for Anthropology, Ethnology, and Prehistory, which would use the ZfE as its main publication outlet. 

In 1873, he was one of the founders and first director of the Ethnological Museum of Berlin, and served as its first director. Its collection of ethnographic artifacts became one of the largest in the world for decades to come. Among others who worked under him at the museum were the young Franz Boas, who later founded the American school of ethnology, and Felix von Luschan.

In the 1870s Bastian left Berlin and again traveled extensively in Africa as well as the New World. He was elected as a member to the American Philosophical Society in 1886.

He died in Port of Spain, Trinidad and Tobago during one of these journeys in 1905.

Works

 Travels in Burma in the Years 1861–1862
 Travels in Siam in the Year 1863
 Travels in China...
Die deutsche Expedition an der Loango-Küste (1874)

Bastian is remembered as one of the pioneers of the concept of the 'psychic unity of mankind' – the idea that all humans share a basic mental framework. This became the basis in other guises of 20th century structuralism, and influenced Carl Jung's idea of the collective unconscious. He also argued that the world was divided up into different 'geographical provinces' and that each of these provinces moved through the same stages of evolutionary development. According to Bastian, innovations and culture traits tended not to diffuse across areas. Rather, each province took its unique form as a result of its environment. This approach was part of a larger nineteenth century interest in the 'comparative method' as practiced by anthropologists such as Edward B. Tylor.

While Bastian considered himself to be extremely scientific, it is worth noting that he emerged from the naturalist tradition that was inspired by Johann Gottfried Herder and exemplified by figures such as Alexander von Humboldt. For him, empiricism meant a rejection of philosophy in favor of scrupulous observations. As a result, he remained hostile to Darwin's theory of evolution (and its main German advocate, Ernst Haeckel), because the physical transformation of species had never been empirically observed, despite the fact that he posited a similar evolutionary development for human civilization. Additionally, he was much more concerned with documenting unusual civilizations before they vanished (presumably as a result of contact with Western civilization) than with the rigorous application of scientific observation. As a result, some  have criticized his works for being disorganized collections of facts rather than coherently structured or carefully researched empirical studies.

In arguing for a "psychic unity of mankind," Bastian proposed a straightforward project for the long-term development of a science of human culture and consciousness.
He argued that the mental acts of all people everywhere on the planet are the products of physiological mechanisms characteristic of the human species.
Every human mind inherits a complement of species-specific "elementary ideas" (Elementargedanken), and hence the minds of all people, regardless of their race or culture, operate in the same way.

According to Bastian, the contingencies of geographic location and historical background create different local elaborations of the "elementary ideas"; these he called "folk ideas" (Völkergedanken).  Bastian also proposed a "genetic principle" by which societies develop over the course of their history from exhibiting simple sociocultural institutions to becoming increasingly complex in their organization.
Through the accumulation of ethnographic data, we can study the psychological laws of mental development as they reveal themselves in diverse regions and under differing conditions.  Although one is speaking with individual informants, Bastian held that the object of research is not the study of the individual per se, but rather the "folk ideas" or "collective mind" of a particular people.

The more one studies various peoples, Bastian thought, the more one sees that the historically conditioned "folk ideas" are of secondary importance compared with the universal "elementary ideas".  The individual is like the cell in an organism, a social animal whose mind – its "folk ideas" – is influenced by its social background; and the "elementary ideas" are the ground from which these “folk ideas” develop.  From this perspective, the social group has a kind of group mind, a "societal soul" (Gesellschaftsseele), in which the individual mind is embedded.
These ideas of Bastian's prefigured (and influenced) the later study of psychological archetypes, comparative mythology, cultural universals and cross-cultural psychology.

Bastian believed that the "elementary ideas" are to be scientifically reconstructed from "folk ideas" as varying forms of collective representations (Gesellschaftsgedanken).
Because one cannot observe the collective representations per se, Bastian felt that the ethnographic project had to proceed through a series of five analytical steps (see Koepping, 1983):

1.  Fieldwork:  Empirical description of cross-cultural data (as opposed to armchair philosophy; Bastian himself spent much of his adult life among non-European peoples).
2.  Deduction of collective representations:  From cross-cultural data we describe the collective representations in a given society.
3.  Analysis of folk ideas:  Collective representations are broken down into constituent folk ideas.  Geographical regions often exhibit similar patterns of folk ideas – he called these “idea circles” which described the collective representations of particular regions.
4.  Deduction of elementary ideas:  Resemblances between folk ideas and patterns of folk ideas across regions indicate underlying elementary ideas.
5.  Application of a scientific psychology:  Study of elementary ideas defines the psychic unity of mankind, which is due to the underlying psychophysiological structure of the species – this study is to be accomplished by a truly scientific, cross-culturally grounded psychology.

Notes

References

External links

 

1826 births
1905 deaths
Scientists from Bremen
Writers from Bremen
German anthropologists
German ethnographers
German ethnologists
Heidelberg University alumni
Humboldt University of Berlin alumni
University of Jena alumni
University of Würzburg alumni
German male writers
Members of the German Academy of Sciences Leopoldina
Members of the American Philosophical Society
German explorers of Africa